96 Rock can refer to an American radio station:

WDIZ_AM - HD2 - Streaming 96rock.iHeart.com in Panama City, Florida
WBBB in Raleigh, North Carolina
WFTK in Cincinnati, Ohio
WKZP in Salisbury/Ocean City, Maryland
WWPW Former longtime 96 Rock station in Atlanta, Georgia. Now, branded as Power 96.1